The Tariff Commission was established in the United Kingdom in December 1903 by Joseph Chamberlain.  The Commission was set up under the auspices of the Tariff Reform League. William Hewins the economist and first director of the London School of Economics from 1895 to 1903, was Secretary and Sir Robert Herbert, the first Premier of Queensland, Australia, was Chairman. The Commission consisted of 59 business men whose brief was to construct a "Scientific Tariff" which would achieve tariff reform objectives.

The aims of the Commission were to examine and report on Chamberlain's proposals for tariff reform.

Members of the Commission included:
 Sir Vincent Caillard, International financier
Henry Birchenough, Silk manufacturer and special commissioner appointed by the Board of Trade in 1903 to inquire into and report upon the present position and future prospects of British trade in South Africa
Sir Andrew Noble, 1st Baronet Scottish physicist, 
Sir Charles Tennant, President of United Alkali, businessman
Sir Alexander Henderson, 1st Baron Faringdon a British financier and Liberal Unionist Member of Parliament.
Sir Samuel Bagster Boulton, chairman of Burt, Boulton, and Haywood (Limited), of London, Paris, Riga, Salzaette, and Bilbao, timber merchants and contractors. He was also chairman of the Dominion Tar and Chemical Company (Limited), and of the British Australian Timber Company (Limited).
Alfred Gilbey, younger brother of Walter Gilbey, wine and spirits dealer
Vicary Gibbs (St Albans MP)

The Commission intended to publish reports on every industry that they investigated and bring these together into a final report that would lay out a full tariff scheme. Seven volumes were published, but lack of funds caused the eventual abandonment of publishing

Further reading

References

External links
London School of Economics Library; accessed 7 October 2017

Protectionism
1903 establishments in the United Kingdom